Yahya Atan (4 August 1954 – 27 February 2022) was a Malaysian field hockey player. He competed at the 1984 Summer Olympics in Los Angeles, where the Malaysian team placed 11th.

He also coached the national junior World Cup team that finished 12th at the 2001 Tasmania Hockey Junior World Cup.

He died from a stroke in Kuala Lumpur on 27 February 2022, at the age of 67.

References

External links

1954 births
2022 deaths
Field hockey players at the 1984 Summer Olympics
Malaysian male field hockey players
Malaysian people of Malay descent
Olympic field hockey players of Malaysia